This is a list of ecoregions in Guyana.

Terrestrial ecoregions
Guyana is in the Neotropical realm. Ecoregions are listed by biome.

Tropical and subtropical moist broadleaf forests
 Guianan Highlands moist forests
 Guianan moist forests
 Orinoco Delta swamp forests
 Tepuis
 Uatuma-Trombetas moist forests

Tropical and subtropical grasslands, savannas, and shrublands
 Guianan savanna

Mangroves
 Guianan mangroves

References
 Dinerstein, Eric; David Olson; Douglas J. Graham; et al. (1995). A Conservation Assessment of the Terrestrial Ecoregions of Latin America and the Caribbean. World Bank, Washington, D.C..

 
ecoregions
Guyana